This is a List of schools in Wiltshire, England.

State-funded schools

Primary schools 

 Alderbury & West Grimstead CE Primary School, Alderbury
 All Cannings CE Primary School, All Cannings
 Aloeric Primary School, Melksham
 Amesbury Archer Primary School, Amesbury
 Amesbury CE Primary School, Amesbury
 Ashton Keynes CE Primary School, Ashton Keynes
 The Avenue Primary School, Warminster
 Baydon St Nicholas CE Primary School, Baydon
 Bellefield Primary School, Trowbridge
 Bemerton St John CE Primary, Bemerton
 Bishops Cannings CE Primary School, Bishops Cannings
 Bitham Brook Primary School, Westbury
 Bowerhill Primary School, Bowerhill
 Box CE Primary School, Box
 Bratton Primary School, Bratton
 Brinkworth Earl Danby's CE Primary, Brinkworth
 Broad Chalke CE Primary School, Broad Chalke
 Broad Hinton CE Primary School, Broad Hinton
 Broad Town CE Primary School, Broad Town
 Bulford St Leonard's CE Primary School, Bulford
 Burbage Primary School, Burbage
 By Brook Valley CE Primary School, Yatton Keynell
 Castle Mead School, Hilperton
 Chapmanslade CE Primary School, Chapmanslade
 Charter Primary School, Chippenham
 Cherhill CE School, Cherhill
 Chilmark and Fonthill Bishop CE Primary School, Chilmark
 Chilton Foliat CE Primary School, Chilton Foliat
 Chirton CE Primary School, Chirton
 Christ Church CE Primary School, Bradford on Avon
 Christ The King RC School, Amesbury
 Christian Malford CE Primary School, Christian Malford
 Churchfields The Village School, Atworth
 Clarendon Infants' School, Tidworth
 Clarendon Junior School, Tidworth
 Colerne CE Primary School, Colerne
 Collingbourne CE Primary School, Collingbourne Ducis
 Coombe Bissett CE Primary School, Coombe Bissett
 Corsham Primary School, Corsham
 The Corsham Regis Primary Academy, Corsham
 Crockerton CE Primary School, Crockerton
 Crudwell CE Primary School, Crudwell
 Dauntsey Academy Primary School, West Lavington
 Derry Hill CE Primary School, Derry Hill
 Dilton Marsh CE Primary School, Dilton Marsh
 Dinton CE Primary School, Dinton
 Downton CE Primary School, Downton
 Durrington All Saints CE Infants' School, Durrington
 Durrington CE Junior School, Durrington
 Easton Royal Academy, Easton Royal
 Fitzmaurice Primary School, Bradford on Avon
 Five Lanes CE Primary School, Worton
 Forest and Sandridge CE Primary School, Sandridge
 Frogwell Primary School, Chippenham
 Fynamore Primary School, Calne
 Gomeldon Primary School, Gomeldon
 Great Bedwyn CE School, Great Bedwyn
 Great Wishford CE Primary School, Great Wishford
 Greentrees Primary School, Salisbury
 The Grove Primary School, Trowbridge
 Harnham CE Junior School, Harnham
 Harnham Infants' School, Harnham
 Heddington CE Primary School, Heddington
 Heytesbury CE Primary School, Heytesbury
 Hilmarton Primary School, Hilmarton
 Hilperton CE Primary School, Hilperton
 Hindon CE Primary School, Hindon
 Holbrook Primary School, Trowbridge
 Holt Primary School, Holt
 Holy Trinity CE Academy, Quemerford
 The Holy Trinity CE Primary Academy, Great Cheverell
 Horningsham Primary School, Horningsham
 Hullavington CE Primary School, Hullavington
 Ivy Lane Primary School, Chippenham
 Keevil CE Academy, Keevil
 Kennet Valley CE Primary School, Lockeridge
 King's Gate Primary School, Amesbury
 King's Lodge Primary School, Chippenham
 Kington St Michael CE Primary School, Kington St Michael
 Kiwi Primary School, Bulford Camp
 Lacock CE Primary School, Lacock
 Langley Fitzurse CE Primary School, Kington Langley
 Larkhill Primary School, Larkhill
 Lea and Garsdon CE Primary School, Lea
 Longford CE Primary School, Britford
 Longleaze Primary School, Royal Wootton Bassett
 Luckington Community School, Luckington
 Ludgershall Castle Primary School, Ludgershall
 Ludwell Community Primary School, Ludwell
 Lydiard Millicent CE Primary School, Lydiard Millicent
 Lyneham Primary School, Lyneham
 Malmesbury CE Primary School, Malmesbury
 The Manor CE Primary School, Melksham
 Manor Fields Primary School, Salisbury
 Marden Vale CE Academy, Calne
 Marlborough St Mary's CE Primary School, Marlborough
 The Mead Community Primary School, Hilperton
 Mere School, Mere
 Minety CE Primary School, Minety
 The Minster CE Primary School, Warminster
 Monkton Park Primary School, Chippenham
 Morgan's Vale and Woodfalls CE Primary School, Redlynch
 Neston Primary School, Neston
 Netheravon All Saints CE Primary School, Netheravon
 New Close Primary School, Warminster
 The New Forest CE Primary School, Nomansland
 Newton Tony CE School, Newton Tony
 Newtown Community Primary School, Trowbridge
 Noremarsh Junior School, Royal Wootton Bassett
 North Bradley CE Primary School, North Bradley
 Nursteed Community Primary School, Devizes
 Oaksey CE Primary School, Oaksey
 Oare CE Primary School, Oare
 Oasis Academy Longmeadow, Trowbridge
 Ogbourne CE Primary School, Ogbourne St George
 Old Sarum Primary School, Old Sarum
 Paxcroft Primary School, Trowbridge
 Pembroke Park Primary School, Salisbury
 Pewsey Primary School, Pewsey
 Pitton CE Primary School, Pitton
 Preshute CE Primary School, Manton
 Priestly Primary School, Calne
 Princecroft Primary School, Warminster
 Queen's Crescent School, Chippenham
 Ramsbury Primary School, Ramsbury
 Redland Primary School, Chippenham
 Ridgeway Farm CE Academy, Purton
 River Mead School, Melksham
 Rowde CE Academy, Rowde
 Rushall CE School, Rushall
 St Andrew's CE Primary School, Laverstock
 St Barnabas CE School, Market Lavington
 St Bartholomew's Primary Academy, Royal Wootton Bassett
 St Edmund's RC Primary School, Calne
 St George's CE Primary School, Semington
 St George's RC Primary School, Warminster
 St John's CE School, Warminster
 St John's CE Primary School, Tisbury
 St John's RC Primary School, Trowbridge
 St Joseph's RC Primary School, Devizes
 St Joseph's RC Primary School, Malmesbury
 St Katharine's CE Primary School, Great Bedwyn
 St Mark's CE Junior School, Salisbury
 St Martin's CE Primary School, Salisbury
 St Mary's Broughton Gifford CE Primary School, Broughton Gifford
 St Mary's CE Primary School, Purton
 St Mary's RC Primary School, Chippenham
 St Michael's CE Primary, Aldbourne
 St Michael's CE Primary School, Larkhill
 St Nicholas CE Primary School, Bromham
 St Nicholas CE Primary School, Porton
 St Osmund's RC Primary School, Salisbury
 St Patrick's RC Primary School, Corsham
 St Paul's Primary School, Chippenham
 St Peter's CE Academy, Chippenham
 St Peter's CE Primary Academy, Salisbury
 St Sampson's CE Primary School, Cricklade
 St Thomas à Becket CE Primary School, Tilshead
 Sambourne CE Primary School, Warminster
 Sarum St Pauls CE Primary School, Salisbury
 Seagry CE Primary School, Upper Seagry
 Seend CE Primary School, Seend
 Semley CE Primary School, Semley
 Shalbourne CE Primary School, Shalbourne
 Shaw CE Primary School, Shaw
 Sherston CE Primary School, Sherston
 Shrewton CE Primary Academy, Shrewton
 Somerfords' Walter Powell CE Primary Academy, Great Somerford
 Southbroom Infants' School, Devizes
 Southbroom St James Academy, Devizes
 Southwick CE Primary School, Southwick
 Stanton St Quintin Primary School, Stanton St Quintin
 Staverton CE Primary School, Staverton
 Stratford-sub-Castle CE Primary School, Stratford-sub-Castle
 Studley Green Primary School, Trowbridge
 Sutton Benger CE Primary School, Sutton Benger
 Sutton Veny CE School, Sutton Veny
 The Trinity CE Primary Academy, Devizes
 Urchfont CE Primary School, Urchfont
 Walwayne Court School, Trowbridge
 Wansdyke School, Devizes
 Wardour RC Primary School, Wardour
 Wellington Eagles Primary Academy, Ludgershall
 Wellington Lions Primary Academy, Tidworth
 West Ashton CE Primary School, West Ashton
 Westbury CE Junior School, Westbury
 Westbury Infant School, Westbury
 Westbury Leigh CE Primary School, Westbury
 Westwood-with-Iford Primary School, Lower Westwood
 Whiteparish All Saints CE Primary School, Whiteparish
 Whitesheet CE Primary Academy, Zeals
 Wilton CE Primary School, Wilton
 Winsley CE Primary School, Winsley
 Winterbourne Earls CE Primary School, Winterbourne Earls
 Winterslow CE Primary School, Winterslow
 Woodborough CE Primary School, Woodborough
 Woodford Valley CE Primary Academy, Middle Woodford
 Woodlands Primary School, Salisbury
 Wootton Bassett Infants' School, Royal Wootton Bassett
 Wylye Valley CE Primary School, Codford
 Wyndham Park Infants' School, Salisbury
 Zouch Academy, Tidworth

Non-selective secondary schools 

 Abbeyfield School, Chippenham
 Avon Valley Academy, Durrington
 Bradon Forest School, Purton
 The Clarendon Academy, Trowbridge
 The Corsham School, Corsham
 Devizes School, Devizes
 Hardenhuish School, Chippenham
 The John of Gaunt School, Trowbridge
 Kingdown School, Warminster
 Kingsbury Green Academy, Calne
 Lavington School, Market Lavington
 Malmesbury School, Malmesbury
 Matravers School, Westbury
 Melksham Oak Community School, Melksham
 Pewsey Vale School, Pewsey
 Royal Wootton Bassett Academy, Royal Wootton Bassett
 St Augustine's Catholic College, Trowbridge
 St John's Marlborough, Marlborough
 St Joseph's Catholic School, Laverstock
 St Laurence School, Bradford-on-Avon
 Sarum Academy, Salisbury
 Sheldon School, Chippenham
 The Stonehenge School, Amesbury
 The Trafalgar School at Downton, Downton
 The Wellington Academy, Tidworth
 Wyvern St Edmund's, Laverstock

Grammar schools 
 Bishop Wordsworth's School, Salisbury
 South Wilts Grammar School, Salisbury

Special and alternative schools 
Source:
 Downland School, Devizes
 Exeter House School, Salisbury
 Silverwood School, Rowde
 The Springfields Academy, Calne

Further education 
 Salisbury Sixth Form College, Salisbury
 Wiltshire College, Chippenham, Trowbridge, Salisbury & Lackham

Independent schools

Primary and preparatory schools

 Avondale Preparatory School, Bulford
 Chafyn Grove School, Salisbury
 Cricklade Manor Prep, Cricklade
 Heywood Prep, Corsham
 Lumiar Stowford School, Wingfield
 St Francis School, Pewsey
 St Margaret's Preparatory School, Calne
 Salisbury Cathedral School, Salisbury
 Sandroyd School, Tollard Royal

Senior and all-through schools

 Bishopstrow College, Bishopstrow
 Dauntsey's School, West Lavington
 Emmaus School, Staverton
 The Godolphin School, Salisbury
 Leehurst Swan School, Salisbury
 Marlborough College, Marlborough
 OneSchool Global UK, Wilton
 St Mary's School, Calne
 Stonar School, Atworth
 Warminster School, Warminster

Special and alternative schools 

 Appleford School, Shrewton
 Calder House School, Colerne
 Compass Community School Athelstan Park, Westbury
 Coombe House School, Donhead St Mary
 The Eaves Learning Centre, Heywood
 Meadow Bridge School, Cricklade
 On Track Education Centre, Westbury
 The Spires, Salisbury
 The WASP Centre, Salisbury

References 

Wiltshire
 
Lists of buildings and structures in Wiltshire